The 1999 Kmart 400 presented by Castrol Super Clean was the 14th stock car race of the 1999 NASCAR Winston Cup Series season and the 31st iteration of the event. The race was held on Sunday, June 13, 1999, in front of an audience of 125,000 in Brooklyn, Michigan, at Michigan International Speedway, a two-mile (3.2 km) moderate-banked D-shaped speedway. The race took the scheduled 200 laps to complete. In a caution-free race, Robert Yates Racing driver Dale Jarrett would dominate for most of the race to take his 20th career NASCAR Winston Cup Series victory and his second of the season. To fill out the podium, Hendrick Motorsports driver Jeff Gordon and Roush Racing driver Jeff Burton would finish second and third, respectively.

Background 

The race was held at Michigan International Speedway, a two-mile (3.2 km) moderate-banked D-shaped speedway located in Brooklyn, Michigan. The track is used primarily for NASCAR events. It is known as a "sister track" to Texas World Speedway as MIS's oval design was a direct basis of TWS, with moderate modifications to the banking in the corners, and was used as the basis of Auto Club Speedway. The track is owned by International Speedway Corporation. Michigan International Speedway is recognized as one of motorsports' premier facilities because of its wide racing surface and high banking (by open-wheel standards; the 18-degree banking is modest by stock car standards).

Entry list 

 (R) denotes rookie driver.

Practice

First practice 
The first practice session was held on Friday, June 11, at 10:15 AM EST. The session would last for one hour and 30 minutes.

Second practice 
The first practice session was held on Friday, June 11, at 1:15 PM EST. The session would last for one hour and 15 minutes.

Final practice 
The final practice session, sometimes referred to as Happy Hour, was held on Saturday, June 12, after the preliminary 1999 Michigan ARCA 200. The session would last for one hour.

Qualifying 
Qualifying was split into two rounds. The first round was held on Friday, June 11, at 3:30 PM EST. Each driver would have one lap to set a time. During the first round, the top 25 drivers in the round would be guaranteed a starting spot in the race. If a driver was not able to guarantee a spot in the first round, they had the option to scrub their time from the first round and try and run a faster lap time in a second round qualifying run, held on Saturday, June 12, at 11:15 AM EST. As with the first round, each driver would have one lap to set a time. Positions 26-36 would be decided on time, while positions 37-43 would be based on provisionals. Six spots are awarded by the use of provisionals based on owner's points. The seventh is awarded to a past champion who has not otherwise qualified for the race. If no past champion needs the provisional, the next team in the owner points will be awarded a provisional.

Three drivers would fail to qualify: Dave Marcis, Hut Stricklin, and Buckshot Jones.

Full qualifying results 

*Time not available.

Race results

References 

1999 NASCAR Winston Cup Series
NASCAR races at Michigan International Speedway
June 1999 sports events in the United States
1999 in sports in Michigan